The Al Hamriya Sports Club Stadium is an association football stadium in Al Hamriyah, United Arab Emirates, with a capacity of 5,000. It's primarily used by Al Hamriyah SC.

References

Football venues in the United Arab Emirates